The 1988 United States presidential election in Colorado took place on November 8, 1988, as part of the 1988 United States presidential election, which was held throughout all 50 states and D.C. Voters chose eight representatives, or electors to the Electoral College, who voted for president and vice president.

Colorado voted for the Republican nominee, Vice President George H. W. Bush, over the Democratic nominee, Massachusetts Governor Michael Dukakis, by a margin of 7.78%. Bush took 53.06% of the vote to Dukakis' 45.28%.

While the Republicans held onto Colorado's eight electoral votes, Bush's 53–45 win over Dukakis represented a vastly diminished margin compared to 1984, when Ronald Reagan had won the state in a 63–35 landslide over Walter Mondale. Unlike in the several preceding elections, Colorado voted roughly in line with the nation overall, which Bush won by 7.72%. Dukakis made substantial inroads by improving on Mondale's vote share in the city of Denver by over 10% (getting the highest vote share of any nominee in the city since Lyndon Johnson in 1964), becoming the first Democrat since 1964 (and only the second since 1936) to carry Boulder County, and comfortably reclaiming Pitkin County, which had supported McGovern in 1972 but had gone on to vote Republican in the next three elections.

These inroads lay the groundwork for Clinton's carrying Colorado for the Democrats for the first time since 1964 in 1992. In 1996, with the receding of the Perot vote, Colorado returned to being a relatively red state, narrowly supporting Bob Dole even as he lost badly nationally. Nevertheless, in contrast with 1972, 1976, 1980, and 1984, Colorado would never again, as of 2020, vote Republican in a presidential election by double digits. After 2004, as of 2020, it has not voted Republican at all.

As of the 2020 presidential election, this is the last election in which Summit County voted for a Republican presidential candidate.

Bush became the first Republican to win the White House without carrying Boulder County since William Howard Taft in 1908.

Results

Results by county

References

Colorado
1988
1988 Colorado elections